Jugoslav Lazić (born 12 December 1979) is a Serbian former footballer who played as a goalkeeper.

Career
Lazić made his senior debut at his hometown club Napredak Kruševac in 1997. He spent seven seasons with the team, appearing for them in the 2000–01 UEFA Cup. In the summer of 2004, Lazić moved abroad to Belgian side Lokeren. He spent the following 11 years at the club, winning two national cups.

Career statistics

Honours
Napredak Kruševac
 Second League of FR Yugoslavia: 1999–2000, 2002–03
 FR Yugoslavia Cup: Runner-up 1999–2000
Lokeren
 Belgian Cup: 2011–12, 2013–14
 Belgian Super Cup: Runner-up 2012, 2014

References

External links
 
 
 
 

Association football goalkeepers
Belgian Pro League players
Expatriate footballers in Belgium
First League of Serbia and Montenegro players
FK Napredak Kruševac players
K.S.C. Lokeren Oost-Vlaanderen players
Second League of Serbia and Montenegro players
Serbia and Montenegro expatriate footballers
Serbia and Montenegro expatriate sportspeople in Belgium
Serbia and Montenegro footballers
Serbian expatriate footballers
Serbian expatriate sportspeople in Belgium
Serbian footballers
Sportspeople from Kruševac
1979 births
Living people